Ourgou-Manéga is a department or commune of Oubritenga Province in Burkina Faso.

References 

Departments of Burkina Faso
Oubritenga Province